John Avire  is a Kenyan professional footballer who plays as a striker for Egyptian club misr el makasa in the Egyptian premier league and the Kenya national team.

International
He made his Kenya national football team debut on 7 June 2019 in a friendly against Madagascar.

He was selected for the 2019 Africa Cup of Nations squad.

References

External links
 
 
 

1997 births
Living people
Kenyan footballers
Kenyan expatriate footballers
Kenya international footballers
Association football forwards
Kakamega Homeboyz F.C. players
Mt Kenya United F.C. players
Bandari F.C. (Kenya) players
Sofapaka F.C. players
Tanta SC players
Kenyan Premier League players
2019 Africa Cup of Nations players
Kenyan expatriate sportspeople in Egypt
Expatriate footballers in Egypt